Simon Petru Cristofini (1903–1943), also known as Pietro Simone Cristofini, was a Corsican soldier who commanded the Phalange Africaine during World War II and was executed for treason by the French authorities because of his support to Italian irredentism in Corsica during the Italian occupation of Corsica.

Biography

Early life 
Cristofini was born in Calenzana, Haute-Corse on 26 May 1903.

World War II 
In 1939 became a Captain of the 3rd Algerian Tirailleurs Regiment. He was initially a supporter of Marshal Philippe Pétain.

Allied forces landed in French Morocco and Algeria in November 1942. Immediately, German and Italian reinforcements landed in French Tunisia and on 14 November the idea of an African Phalange was mooted in Paris with the support of the Third Reich Ambassador Otto Abetz. In December, German authorities approved the plan and 330 volunteers were recruited under the command of Cristofini. The troops trained at the Bordj-Ceda camp and a 210 man company, called Franzosische Freiwilligen Legion, was eventually incorporated into the 2nd Battalion, 754th Panzer Grenadier Regiment, part of the 5th Panzerarmee.

In Tunisia Cristofini was wounded in one eye. Before returning to Corsica he met Benito Mussolini in Rome.

Colonel Cristofini was a supporter of the union of Corsica with Italy and defended irredentist ideals. He actively collaborated with Italian forces in Corsica during the first months of 1943 and worked with Petru Giovacchini, the possible governor of Corsica if the Axis had won the war). Cristofini, as head of the Vichy troops in Ajaccio helped the Italian Army to repress Resistance opposition in Corsica before the Italian Armistice in September 1943.

He was put on trial for treason after the Allies retook Corsica, and sentenced to death. He tried to kill himself, and was executed while suffering from his wounds in November 1943.

After World War II 
His wife, Marta Renucci, was sentenced to 15 years of jail in Algiers in 1946 for supporting irredentism and for collaborating with Italian fascism, but served only a reduced sentence.

See also
 Italian-occupied Corsica

Notes

1903 births
1943 deaths
People from Haute-Corse
French Army officers
French Army personnel of World War II
Italian irredentism
Executed French collaborators with Nazi Germany
People executed by the Provisional Government of the French Republic
Corsican collaborators with Nazi Germany